Sean or Seán Lynch may refer to:

Seán Lynch (politician) (born 1954), Irish politician and former Provisional IRA commander
Sean Lynch (footballer) (born 1987), Scottish footballer, currently with Airdrie United FC
Sean Lynch (rugby union) (born 1942), Irish rugby union player
Sean Lynch (artist) (born 1978), Irish visual artist